Dem Mob, stylised as DEM MOB, is an Aboriginal hip hop group from the APY lands in northern South Australia, the first to rap in the Pitjantjatjara language.

Background
Starting out as a duo comprising Jontae Lawrie and Elisha Umuhuri, the young rappers, were partially inspired by Baker Boy, with their collaboration was instigated as part of a school project at Ernabella Anangu school. In a region dominated by reggae music, they wanted to inspire the local youth with something different. The pair was brought by Northern Sound System to WOMADelaide in March 2020 to be recorded while performing live in front of an audience for the first time. Later that year they were joined by Nason Lawrie. All three are from Pukatja (although Jontae lived in Ceduna as a young child) and have since released several music videos and performed live at festivals in Adelaide and Alice Springs. They rap in English and Pitjantjatjara languages, the first to do so in this Aboriginal Australian language, and have family ties to members of No Fixed Address, Yothu Yindi and Coloured Stone.

The musical profile afforded by Dem Mob has given Umuhuri the opportunity to connect with his biological family. He was born in New Zealand before being adopted by a family living in the Northern Territory as a two-week-old baby, and in his early years travelled around with his adoptive family as his parents followed employment opportunities. When Dem Mob were performing in Alice Springs in 2022, one of his cousins was sent from New Zealand to watch them by his biological mother. Umuhuri appreciates finding the connection to his homeland and family roots, but sees himself as a Pitjantjatjara / Yankunytjatjara man, as he was brought up in this culture,

Career
Dem Mob performed at Tandanya for the Treaty Festival (part of NAIDOC Week) in November 2020.

In January 2021, the band, along with nine other groups and solo artists, were selected to participate in a year-long program of music workshops and other activities, in the WOMADelaide X NSS Academy.

In April/May 2021, Dem Mob performed at the Wide Open Space festival in Alice Springs.

In July 2021, Dem Mob were scheduled to perform at Tandanya as part of the Illuminate Adelaide festival, at an event called Kinara (meaning "moon" in the Pintupi language); however, the state's first 7-day lockdown due to the COVID-19 pandemic took place from 21 to 27 July, and most of the Illuminate Adelaide events had to be cancelled or postponed.

In August 2021 the band released "Still No Justice", which talks about the Black Lives Matter movement, Aboriginal deaths in custody and racism in Australia, and urges Aboriginal youth growing up in Alice Springs to turn away from crime, as they grow up to be the new community elders. The song was inspired by the shooting death of Kumanjayi Walker at the hands of Northern Territory police officer Zachary Rolfe in 2019.

In mid-2022 Dem Mob was selected for the second round of WOMADelaide X NSS Academy.

They played at WOMADelaide in March 2023.

Other performances
Dem Mob have also performed  at the Art Gallery of South Australia in its "First Fridays" series, and have supported J-MILLA and Electric Fields.

Awards and nominations
2021: Finalist, Best Regional or Torres Strait Islander Artist, South Australian Music Awards
2021: Best Hip-Hop Act, South Australian Music Awards
2022: Finalist, Best Regional or Torres Strait Islander Artist, South Australian Music Awards
2022: Best Hip-Hop Act, South Australian Music Awards

References 

Australian hip hop groups